Meera Nagar is a village in Sitapur district, Uttar Pradesh, India.

References

Villages in Sitapur district